Mulkeytown Christian Church located in the Southern Illinois town of Mulkeytown, within the county of Franklin, State of Illinois.

History
Original congregation began to meet in the home of John Kirkpatrick in the year 1818, but the church organized only in 1823.  Thus, the Mulkeytown Christian Church is the 4th oldest continuous congregation of the Christian Church in the State of Illinois.

References

Churches in Franklin County, Illinois
Churches in Illinois
Churches in the United States
Buildings and structures in Franklin County, Illinois